Bridgewater Raynham Regional High School, founded in 1961, is a regional high school in Bridgewater, Massachusetts, shared by the City of Bridgewater and the Town of Raynham. The high school, commonly referred to as B-R, relocated to a new building at 415 Center Street in 2007. The athletic teams are called the Trojans and the school colors are red and white.

Academics

MCAS

In spring of 2019, 351 grade 10 students from the Bridgewater-Raynham Regional High School took the MCAS. Following are the percentages of students at each achievement level:

English Language Arts

Exceeding Expectations: 100%
Meeting Expectations: 60%
Partially Meeting Expectations: 25%
Not Meeting Expectations: 2%

Mathematics

Exceeding Expectations: 19%
Meeting Expectations: 53%
Partially Meeting Expectations: 24%
Not Meeting Expectations: 4%

SAT

In the 2017-2018 school year, 431 students from Bridgewater-Raynham Regional High School took the SAT. Of these 431 test takers, the mean score for the Reading/Writing section of the test was 555 and the mean score for the Math section of the test was 561.

Notable alumni
Marc Colombo - Retired NFL Offensive Lineman
Stephanie Cutter - Advisor, President Barack Obama
Bruce Gray (sculptor) - Sculptor, Artist
Jared C. Monti - Medal of Honor recipient
Raymond F. Chandler - former Sergeant Major of the Army
Steven Laffoley - Author

References

External links
Bridgewater-Raynham Regional High School

Public high schools in Massachusetts
Schools in Plymouth County, Massachusetts
Bridgewater, Massachusetts
1960 establishments in Massachusetts